Darg (also known as Darg) is a village in Rudbar-e Mohammad-e Zamani Rural District, Alamout-e Gharbi District, Qazvin County, Qazvin Province, Iran. At the 2006 census, its population was 33, in 16 families.

References 

Populated places in Qazvin County